The Order of Ammon is a secret society of approximately ten Emory University students who are selected based on merit, character, imagination, and persistent commitment to better Emory University and the world-at-large. Members are typically heavily involved in campus organizations and have excelled in academics, athletics, leadership, and service. The Order of Ammon is one of four secret societies at Emory University, which also include Paladin Society, D.V.S. Senior Honor Society, and Ducemus. The members of The Order of Ammon are never revealed, a nod to notable Emory University alumni Robert W. Woodruff, who said "there is no limit to what a man can do or where he can go if he doesn't mind who gets the credit." This differs from the Paladin Society and D.V.S. Senior Honor Society, which reveal their members during graduation.

The Order of Ammon was officially re-chartered and recognized by Emory University in 2005.

References 

Emory University
Collegiate secret societies